The following is a list of compilation albums of songs recorded by U.S. singer Jo Stafford that have been released since 2010. They include material from her solo career, and recordings she made with artists such as Gordon MacRae, as well as her foray into comedy with husband Paul Weston as New Jersey lounge act Jonathan and Darlene Edwards.

Beyond the Stars: Key Recordings 1940-1959

Beyond the Stars: Key Recordings 1940-1959 is a compilation of songs recorded by Jo Stafford. The album includes over 100 songs recorded by Stafford during the 1940s and 1950s, from her time with The Pied Pipers through to her later solo career. The album was released on the JSP label on July 13, 2010.
{| class="wikitable collapsible collapsed" style="width:300px;"
|-
!Track listing
|-
|1 Sweet Potato Piper
|-
|2 Watcha Know Joe
|-
|3 Little Man With a Candy Cigar
|-
|4 I'll Take Tallulah
|-
|5 A Boy In Khaki, a Girl In Lace
|-
|6 Margie
|-
|7 Sweet Lorraine
|-
|8 Darn That Dream
|-
|9 You Can Depend On Me
|-
|10 Lullaby of Broadway
|-
|11 Deacon Jones
|-
|12 Baby Won't You Please Come Home
|-
|13 Ivy
|-
|14 The Nightingale
|-
|15 Red Rosey Bush
|-
|16 Roses of Picardy
|-
|17 I'm My Own Grandma
|-
|18 I'll String Along With You
|-
|19 A Thought In My Heart
|-
|20 When April Comes Again
|-
|21 Teardrops From My Eyes
|-
|22 Till We Meet Again
|-
|23 Along the Colorado Trail
|-
|24 He Bought My Soul At Calvary
|-
|25 Hey Good Lookin'
|-
|26 The Moment I Saw You
|-
|27 Hambone
|-
|28 Pretty Boy
|-
|29 Easy Come, Easy Go
|-
|30 Don't Worry 'Bout Me
|-
|31 Something To Remember You By
|-
|32 I'm in the Mood for Love
|-
|33 September in the Rain
|-
|34 As You Desire Me
|-
|35 Spring is Here
|-
|36 Blue Moon
|-
|37 Make the Man Love Me
|-
|38 Embraceable You
|-
|39 Come Rain or Come Shine
|-
|40 My Romance
|-
|41 All the Things You Are
|-
|42 Dancing In the Dark
|-
|43 Night and Day
|-
|44 September Song
|-
|45 They Say It's Wonderful
|-
|46 I'm Your Girl
|-
|47 Christmas Blues
|-
|48 Adi-Adios Amigo
|-
|49 The Dixieland Band
|-
|50 April and You
|-
|51 Let Me Hear You Whisper
|-
|52 Suddenly
|-
|53 The Christmas Song
|-
|54 The Night Watch
|-
|55 Piece a-Puddin|-
|56 Young and Foolish
|-
|57 June In January
|-
|58 These Foolish Things
|-
|59 But Not For Me
|-
|60 My Old Flame
|-
|61 A Foggy Day
|-
|62 Nice Work If You Can Get It
|-
|63 Almost Like Being In Love
|-
|64 You're Mine You
|-
|65 The Gypsy In My Soul
|-
|66 The Lady is a Tramp
|-
|67 Autumn Leaves
|-
|68 Mine
|-
|69 One For My Baby
|-
|70 Taking a Chance On Love [Uk 78 Version] [Version]
|-
|71 Taking a Chance On Love
|-
|72 Speak Low
|-
|73 I Got It Bad (and That Ain't Good)
|-
|74 Old Devil Moon
|-
|75 Love For Sale
|-
|76 Anything Goes
|-
|77 How High the Moon
|-
|78 It Never Entered My Mind
|-
|79 Tomorrow Mountain
|-
|80 Any Place I Hang My Hat is Home
|-
|81 Happiness is Just a Thing Called Joe
|-
|82 The Gentleman is a Dope
|-
|83 Underneath the Overpass
|-
|84 I'll Be There (When You Get Lonely)
|-
|85 Silence is Golden
|-
|86 Beyond the Stars
|-
|87 Echoes In the Night
|-
|88 I'll Buy It
|-
|89 Sweet Little Darlin|-
|90 It's Never Quite the Same
|-
|91 I May Never Pass This Way Again
|-
|92 I'll Walk Alone
|-
|93 I'll Be Seeing You
|-
|94 I Should Care
|-
|95 No Love No Nothing
|-
|96 I Fall In Love Too Easily
|-
|97 It Could Happen to You
|-
|98 I'll Remember April
|-
|99 We Mustn't Say Goodbye
|-
|100 I Left My Heart At the Stage Door Canteen
|-
|101 You'll Never Know
|-
|102 I Don't Want To Walk Without You
|-
|103 Yesterdays
|-
|104 Lazy Moon
|-
|105 Hibiscus
|-
|106 My Heart is From Missouri
|-
|107 All Yours
|-
|108 You're Starting To Get To Me
|-
|109 Pinetop's Boogie
|}

The Best of Jo StaffordThe Best of Jo Stafford is a 2010 compilation album of songs recorded by Jo Stafford. It was released by The Fuel Label Group on July 20, 2010 and contains 23 songs by Stafford.

At the Supper Club

This compact disk was created from transcriptions of The Chesterfield Supper Club recorded for the Armed Forces Radio Service (AFRS) in May 1946. Others featured on the broadcasts are Carl Kress and his Orchestra, Helen Carroll and the Satisfiers.

At the Supper Club Part II

This compact disk was created from transcriptions of The Chesterfield Supper Club recorded for the Armed Forces Radio Service (AFRS) in March and April 1946. Others featured on the broadcasts are Carl Kress and his Orchestra, Helen Carroll and the Satisfiers, and Lloyd Shaffer and his Orchestra. Guests are Benny Goodman, Xavier Cugat, Cozy Cole, Mel Powell, and Bob Eberly.

At the Supper Club Part III

At the Supper Club Part III is a 2011 album release of recordings by American singer Jo Stafford. The tracks are taken from her appearances on The Chesterfield Supper Club, the NBC variety program of the 1940s. The recordings on this compilation were made with Lloyd Shaffer and His Orchestra, Paul Weston and His Orchestra, Helen Carroll and The Satisfiers, and The Starlighters. Martin Block is the Master Of Ceremonies.

For You

For You is a 2011 compilation album of songs recorded by American singer Jo Stafford. It was released on the HHO label on May 16, 2011.

Complete Original Albums

Complete Original Albums is a 2011 CD release of two albums recorded by Paul Weston and Jo Stafford in the guise of Jonathan and Darlene Edwards. The CD features the albums The Piano Artistry of Jonathan Edwards (1957) and the Grammy Award winning Jonathan and Darlene Edwards in Paris (1960). In addition there are bonus Stafford and Weston tracks. The album was released on June 21, 2011 on the 101 Distribution label.

Jo Stafford - Fools Rush In: The Great Vocalists of Jazz

Jo Stafford - Fools Rush In: The Great Vocalists of Jazz is a 31-track 2-disc compilation album of songs recorded by Jo Stafford. The album contains recordings made by Stafford between 1944 and 1947. It was released on the History label, and by Meridian Music in Germany in 2008.

Something to Remember 

Something to Remember is a compilation album of recordings by Jo Stafford and Paul Weston.

Jo Stafford & Gordon MacRae - Yesterday - The Definitive Duo

Jo Stafford & Gordon MacRae - Yesterday - The Definitive Duo is a 2011 compilation album of recordings by Jo Stafford and Gordon MacRae released by Jasmine Records on November 18, 2011.
{| class="wikitable collapsible collapsed" style="width:300px;"
|-
!Track listing
|-
!Disc One
|-
|1 Yesterday (Waltz Song)
|-
|2 My Darling, My Darling
|-
|3 Bibbidi-Bobbidi-Boo
|-
|4 Bluebird of Happiness
|-
|5 To Think You've Chosen Me
|-
|6 Whispering Hope
|-
|7 In the Gloaming
|-
|8 Near Me
|-
|9 I'll See You After Church On Sunday Morning
|-
|10 Last Night
|-
|11 Let The Rest Of the World Go By
|-
|12 Down the Lane
|-
|13 The First Cat Song (Nyot Nyow)
|-
|14 Hold Me, Hold Me
|-
|15 Love's Old Sweet Song
|-
|16 The Rosary
|-
|17 Beyond the Sunset
|-
|18 Thank You
|-
|19 A Thought in My Heart
|-
|20 I'm in the Middle of a Riddle
|-
|21 Stars of the Summer Night 
|-
|22 You Are My Love
|-
|23 Tea for Two
|-
|24 Nights of Splendor (Neapolitan Nights)
|-
|25 Echoes
|-
|26 Where Are You Gonna Be When the Moon Shines?
|-
|27 When Day Is Done
|-
|28 Say Something Sweet to Your Sweetheart
|-
|29 A Perfect Day 
|-
!Disc Two
|-
|1 I'll String Along with You
|-
|2 Long, Long Ago
|-
|3 Dearie
|-
|4 Girls Were Made to Take Care of Boys
|-
|5 Need You
|-
|6 Juanita
|-
|7 When It's Springtime in the Rockies
|-
|8 My One and Only Highland Fling
|-
|9 A' - You're Adorable (The Alphabet Song)
|-
|11 Sweet and Low|-
|12 Driftin' Down the Dreary Ol' Ohio|-
|13 Monday, Tuesday, Wednesday|-
|14 Now the Day Is Over|-
|15 Count Your Blessings|-
|16 Scarlet Ribbons|-
|17 Wunderbar|-
|18 Always True to You in My Fashion
|-
|19 Were Thine That Special Face
|-
|20 Why Can't You Behave?
|-
|21 Bianca
|-
|22 Too Darn Hot
|-
|23 I Hate Men
|-
|24 So in Love
|-
|25 Gesu Bambino
|-
|26 Adeste Fideles (O Come, All Ye Faithful)
|-
|28 Christmas Medley
|}

Jo Sings for YouJo Sings for You''' is a 2011 compilation of songs recorded by Jo Stafford released on the Jazzlib label.

References 

 2010
Stafford Compilations 2010
2010s compilation albums
Stafford 2010